Bun Sha Pai is a small uninhabited island in Tai Po District, Hong Kong. It is located south of Che Lei Pai, within Tolo Channel.

Name
The name 'Bun Sha Pai' is derived from it being in the shape of a butterfly, which was known as "Bun Sha" in Chinese historically. Other names of the islet include 'Tung King Pai' and 'Flat Reef'.

References

Uninhabited islands of Hong Kong
Tai Po District
Islands of Hong Kong